Haydee Ong is a Filipino basketball coach and former player. She was the head coach of the Philippines women's national basketball team from 2008 to 2014.

Early life and education
Ong was inspired to play basketball from his father who was a varsity player while her mother initially opposed to the idea of her doing something that is considered as a "men's sport". Haydee Ong later attended the University of Santo Tomas for her collegiate studies under an athletic scholarship. After graduating, she worked as a pharmacist for two years before getting involved in basketball again.

Competitive career
As a player for the University of Santo Tomas from 1987 to 1990, Haydee Ong helped her college win four straight championships at the UAAP. Ong also played for the  Philippines women's national basketball team from 1986 to 1993.

Coaching career

National team
Ong joined the coaching staff of the Philippine women's national team in 1996 and was appointed as head coach of the national team in 2008, replacing Fritz Gatson. The national team under her mentorship also participated in the defunct Women's Philippine Basketball League.

The national team won its first gold medal in a regional tournament at the 2010 SEABA Championship for Women under Ong's watch. The national team also won silver at the 2011 and 2013 Southeast Asian Games.

Her national team coaching stint ended in 2014. Patrick Aquino succeeded her as coach of the national team in 2015.

Collegiate
Ong has coached the Ateneo Lady Eagles of the UAAP for seven years.

She coaches the women's varsity team of Enderun Colleges. She led Enderun on their first National Athletic Association of Schools, Colleges and Universities (NAASCU) stint in 2016 where they managed to become champions by beating Rizal Technological University  in their final game. Ong was also named as Coach of the Year for the 2016 season.

In 2016, Ong began coaching the women's team of her alma mater, the University of Santo Tomas at UAAP Season 79.

Other
She is the athletic director of Immaculate Conception Academy High School in Greenhills.

References

Filipino women's basketball coaches
UST Tigresses basketball players
Living people
Year of birth missing (living people)